The 1970 NCAA College Division football season was the 15th season of college football in the United States organized by the National Collegiate Athletic Association at the NCAA College Division level.

Conference and program changes

Conference changes

Conference standings

Rankings

College Division teams (also referred to as "small college") were ranked in polls by the AP (a panel of writers) and by UPI (coaches). The national champion(s) for each season were determined by the final poll rankings, published at or near the end of the regular season, before any bowl games were played.

College Division final polls
In 1970, both UPI and AP ranked Arkansas State (10–0) number one.  The 34 coaches on the UPI board ranked Tampa second, followed by Montana, while the AP panel ranked Montana second, followed by North Dakota State. Arkansas State went on to beat  in the Pecan Bowl, 38–21, while Montana lost to North Dakota State in the Camellia Bowl, 31–16.

United Press International (coaches) final poll
Published on December 2

Associated Press (writers) final poll
Published on December 3

Includes NAIA playoff win

Bowl games
The postseason consisted of four bowl games as regional finals, all played on December 12.

This was the final year for the Pecan Bowl; it was succeeded by the Pioneer Bowl in Wichita Falls in 1971.

See also
 1970 NCAA University Division football season
 1970 NAIA Division I football season
 1970 NAIA Division II football season

References